Pavel Angelov (born 17 September 1991) is a Bulgarian luger. He competed in the men's singles event at the 2018 Winter Olympics.

References

External links
 

1991 births
Living people
Bulgarian male lugers
Olympic lugers of Bulgaria
Lugers at the 2018 Winter Olympics
Lugers at the 2022 Winter Olympics
People from Kardzhali Province